In the Swing of Christmas is Barry Manilow's third Christmas-themed album, released in 2007. It was available only at Hallmark Cards stores. In 2009, the album was re-released on Arista Records with two added tracks, the first being "Christmas Is Just Around The Corner" from the animated movie A Cranberry Christmas, and the other being "Rudolph The Red Nosed Reindeer".

In 2008, the album was nominated for a Grammy Award in the 'Best Traditional Pop Vocal Album' category. 

Co-produced by Manilow and Scott Erickson, the album also features the Matt Herskowitz trio (Matt Herskowitz, David Rozenblatt and Mat Fieldes - formerly Mad Fusion)

Track listing
 "Silver Bells"–(2:38)
 "Carol of the Bells / Jingle Bells"–(2:46)
 "Joy To The World / It's the Most Wonderful Time of the Year"–(3:08)
 "Have Yourself a Merry Little Christmas"–(4:07)
 "Violets for Your Furs" (Matt Dennis, Tom Adair)–(3:22)
 "O Tannenbaum" / "Winter Wonderland"–(2:58)
 "Christmas Time Is Here" (Lee Mendelson, Vince Guaraldi)–(4:36)
 "The Christmas Song (Chestnuts Roasting On an Open Fire)" (Mel Tormé, Bob Wells)–3:19
 "Toyland"–(3:24)
 "Count Your Blessings"–(3:50)
 "Rudolph the Red-Nosed Reindeer"  (only on 2009 re-packaging)–2:25
 "Christmas Is Just Around the Corner" (Barry Manilow, Bruce Sussman) (only on 2009 re-packaging)–2:51
 "It Came Upon the Midnight Clear" (Hallmark edition download-able bonus track only)

References 

2009 Christmas albums
Christmas albums by American artists
Barry Manilow albums
Arista Records Christmas albums
Swing Christmas albums